A headbutt is a targeted strike with the head, usually to another person's head.

Headbutt may also refer to:
 Headbutt (sculpture), by French artist Adel Abdessemed, at the Centre Pompidou in Paris, France
 "Headbutt" (song), by The King Blues (2010)

See also
 "Headbutts", a song by John Otway and Wild Willy Barrett